Levallois Sporting Club Basket, abbreviated as either LCB Basket or Levallois SCB, is a French basketball club that is based in Levallois, Paris, France. It is the men's basketball section of the French multi-sport club Levallois Sporting Club.

History
Levallois Sporting Club Basket was founded in 1941. The club played in the minor league level divisions of French basketball league system until 1969, when it qualified for a place in the French Second Division. After that, the club soon made it up to the top-level French First Division. In 1992, the club won the French Second Division title.

In pan-European competition, Levallois SCB played in the European-wide 3rd-tier level league, the FIBA Korać Cup, in the 1996–97 season. They won the French Second Division title again in 1998. Levallois SCB played in the French 2nd Division in the 2006–07 season. Following that, Levallois Sporting Club Basket merged with Paris Basket Racing, to form a new version of Paris Basket Racing called Paris-Levallois Basket.

Since then, Levallois SCB has competed in the French men's amateur level minor leagues, and in junior age competitions.

Arenas
Levallois Sporting Club Basket plays its national domestic home league games at the 4,000 seat Palais de Sports Marcel Cerdan. Over the years, the club has also played home games at the 4,200 seat Stade Pierre de Coubertin.

Titles and honors

Domestic competitions
 French 2nd Division
 Champions (2): 1991–92, 1997–98

 French Federation Cup
 Runners-up (2): 1995–96, 1997–98

Notable players

  Sacha Giffa 
  Freddy Hufnagel 
  Stéphane Lauvergne 
  Vincent Masingue 
  Moustapha Sonko 
  Thierry Zig 
   Michael Brooks 
  Wendell Alexis 
  Ronnie Burrell 
  Larry Krystkowiak 
  Garry Plummer
  James Scott 
  Terence Stansbury

See also
Paris Basket Racing
Metropolitans 92

References

External links
 Official athletic club website 
 Official basketball club website 
 Official archive website 
 Levallois Sporting Club Basket at lnb.fr 
 Levallois Sporting Club Basket at fibaeurope.com
 Levallois Sporting Club Basket at Eurobasket.com

Basketball teams established in 1941
Basketball teams in France
1941 establishments in France
Sport in Hauts-de-Seine